Furonazide is a crystalline tuberculostatic drug substance with a reported melting point of 199-201.5 °C.


Synthesis 
Furonazide was first prepared in 1955 by Miyatake from isoniazid and 2-Acetylfuran by refluxing in ethanol, followed by filtration of the crystalline product.

Applications 
Furonazide has shown bacteriostatic action and is tuberculostatic at levels of 10−8 molar. The in vitro antibacterial activity of furonazide against Bacillus Calmette-Guerin was found to be essentially equal to that of isoniazid on an equimolar basis. In vivo studies in the guinea pig showed furonazide slightly more active than isoniazid as a tuberculostatic agent. The drug has relatively low toxicity. The median lethal dose (LD50, rat oral) was reported as 2,600 mg/kg.

References 

2-Furyl compounds
4-Pyridyl compounds
Hydrazides
Anti-tuberculosis drugs